My Autobiography is a book by Charlie Chaplin, first published by Simon & Schuster in 1964. Along with Chaplin: His Life and Art (1985), it provided the source material for the 1992 feature film Chaplin. It provides a revealing look into the life of a 20th-century filmmaker and celebrity. The Chicago Tribune said the book was “The best autobiography ever written by an actor. An astonishing work.” In 2020 The Guardian ranked the book at No. 11 in its list of "The top 25 most compelling Hollywood autobiographies".

References

1964 non-fiction books
Autobiographies adapted into films
Charlie Chaplin
Show business memoirs
Simon & Schuster books
British autobiographies